The dusky millions fish, speckled mosquitofish or the one-spot livebearer (Phalloceros caudimaculatus) is a species of fish native eastern and southern Brazil, northern Argentina, Uruguay and Paraguay. It has also been introduced to Australia, Malawi and New Zealand; primarily for mosquito control, but also as escapees from the aquarium trade. It has been reported as having adverse ecological effects in areas where it has been introduced.

Origins 

This species originated in South America. It is mainly a freshwater fish and thrives best in areas with weak water flow. However, it is extremely adaptable and can thrive in a multitude of altered environments. The species also has a high fecundity.

The dusky millions fish was one of the first species in its family, the Poeciliidae to be bred for aquarium usage. Ecologists also attempted to use the fish as a mosquito control; however, the mosquito fish's diverse diet affected its efficacy as a control species. The mosquito fish can eat a range of different organisms, including algae.

Role as an invasive species 

The dusky millions fish was introduced to a variety of ecosystems both by aquarium keepers and as mosquito pest control. The NSW area of Australia has been affected the most by its presence. It reproduces and spreads well in the winter when there is a larger flow of water. Australian ecologists have tried to contain this spread by killing them with rotenone; however, the infestation persists. This species is most likely to be found in shallow areas with varying levels of vegetation, such as local ponds.

The ecological impact of the dusky millions fish in Australia is pronounced. Its diet has affected populations of both native and non-native fish. An example would be the non-native species Gambusia holbrooki. It has similar features as the dusky millions fish, such as a high reproductive rate and use for mosquito control. However, its population in Australia has diminished since the introduction of the dusky millions fish. Furthermore, this dusky millions fish has also affected the food chain, as they have become prey for native bird species.

References

Poeciliidae
Freshwater fish of South America
Freshwater fish of Argentina
Freshwater fish of Brazil
Fish of Paraguay
Fish of Uruguay
Fish described in 1868